Davidson Berry (27 May 1875 – 26 November 1952) was a Scottish footballer who played for Queen's Park and the Scotland national team.

Berry, an inside left / outside left, joined Queen's Park as a teenager in 1891. Aged just 18, he won his first cap for Scotland in March 1894 and scored in a 5–2 win over Wales. He won two more caps in 1899.

His elder brother, William, also played for Queen's Park and was also a Scotland internationalist.

External links

International stats at Londonhearts.com

1875 births
1952 deaths
Scottish footballers
Scotland international footballers
Queen's Park F.C. players
Association football inside forwards
Association football wingers
Footballers from Glasgow